(28 September 1933 – 14 June 2004) was a Japanese director. Yuasa is the main director of the Japanese film series Gamera, about a giant flying turtle that befriends small boys and battles giant monsters. The series was created by Daiei Film Studios after the box office success of the Toho Godzilla series.

Biography
Noriaki Yuasa was born 28 September 1933 in Tokyo, Japan. Yuasa was the son of a stage actor and began work at a young age as a child actor. After graduating university, he began to seek work on the production of films. Yuasa joined Daiei Studios in 1955 and became director in 1964 with the musical comedy film Shiawasa nara te o tatake. 

Yuasa's next project was a film tentatively tiled Dai gunju Nezura (lit. The Great Rat Swarm) which would involve real rats crawling over miniatures of cities. The rats received for the film had fleas, which halted production on Dai gunju Nezura. As the miniatures for the film were already built, Masaichi Nagata had to develop a giant monster to attack the city and had the idea for a giant flying turtle. Yuasa, with his screenwriter Nisan Takahashi, developed the idea into the 1965 film Gamera the Giant Monster.

Yuasa continued work directing films in the series except Gamera vs. Barugon, where he was only the special effects director. Yuasa's personal favourite of his Gamera films was Gamera vs. Viras. Following the collapse of Daiei in 1971, he predominantly directed work for television, including Electroid Zaborger (1974) and Ultraman 80 (1980). His last full film was Gamera, Super Monster, which included extensive stock footage from the previous seven Gamera films. He later worked on smaller V-Cinema videos such as Kosupure senshi kyūtī naito 2 teikoku-ya no gyakushū. 

Yuasa died of a stroke in Japan on 14 June 2004.

Select filmography

Film

Television
 Denjin Zaborger (1974)
 Ultraman 80 (1980)

V-Cinema
 Kosupure senshi kyūtī naito 2 teikoku-ya no gyakushū (1996)

Notes

References

External links
 

Japanese film directors
1933 births
2004 deaths
People from Tokyo